Sune Alet Wittmann (born 3 February 1995) is a Namibian cricketer. She made her Women's Twenty20 International (WT20I) debut for the Namibia women's cricket team on 5 January 2019, against Zimbabwe, during Zimbabwe's tour of Namibia.

In August 2019, she was named in Namibia's squad for the 2019 ICC Women's World Twenty20 Qualifier tournament in Scotland. She played in Namibia's opening match of the tournament, on 31 August 2019, against Ireland. In May 2021, she was named in Namibia's squad for the 2021 Kwibuka Women's T20 Tournament in Rwanda. In Namibia's third match of the tournament, against Botswana, Wittmann scored a match-winning 93 not out from 60 balls. Following the conclusion of the tournament, Wittmann was named in the team of the tournament, selected by the Rwanda Cricket Association.

In April 2022, Wittmann was named in Namibia's squad for the 2022 Capricorn Women's Tri-Series. On 23 April 2022, in Namibia's match against Uganda, Wittmann took her first five-wicket haul in a WT20I match, with five wickets for ten runs.

References

External links
 
 

1995 births
Living people
Cricketers from Windhoek
Namibian women cricketers
Namibia women Twenty20 International cricketers
North West women cricketers